Imre Nagy first became Chairman of the Council of Ministers of the Hungarian People's Republic (Prime Minister of Hungary) on 4 July 1953 upon the resignation of Mátyás Rákosi, forming a government more moderate than that of his predecessor which attempted to reform the system.  However, Rákosi remained First Secretary of the ruling Hungarian Working People's Party, and he was ultimately able to use his influence force Nagy out of office in April 1955.

After the outbreak of the Hungarian Revolution on 23 October 1956, Nagy was reinstated as prime minister the next day on under intense popular demand.  As the Revolution progressed his government made moves towards a multi-party system, admitting non-Communist politicians to power and reforming the ruling Hungarian Working People's Party into the Hungarian Socialist Workers' Party.  On 3 November Nagy formed a third government with a Communist minority including all the members of the post-war coalition parties: the Independent Smallholders' Party, the Social Democratic Party, and Petőfi Party.

However, the very next day the Soviet Union launched a massive military invasion of Hungary, deposing Nagy and installing a new Communist government under János Kádár. Nagy and his cabinet were granted asylum in the Yugoslav Embassy in Budapest, where they refused to resign and recognize the new regime.  Kádár would not arrive in Budapest until 7 November and his government would not be confirmed until 12 November, and a standoff ensued.  Nagy and his group were finally convinced to leave the Embassy on 22 November under a promise of safe conduct from Kádár, but they were promptly arrested upon leaving the building.  Nagy would be executed after a show trial on the order of Kádár in June 1958, and would not be rehabilitated until the end of Communism in Hungary in 1989.

First government (1953–1955)

Second government (24 October–3 November 1956)

Third government (3–4/12 November 1956)

References

Hungarian Revolution of 1956
Nagy Goverments